Brachiaria ramosa (L.) Stapf (browntop millet) is a perennial millet grass belonging to the grass family (Poaceae). It is native to South Asia, where it is traditionally cultivated as a cereal crop.

The reconstructed Proto-Dravidian name for Brachiaria ramosa is *conna-l.

Other scientific names for browntop millet include Urochloa ramosa (L.) Nguyen and Panicum ramosum (L.).

Pests
Insect pests include:

shoot flies Atherigona oryzae, Atherigona pulla, and Atherigona punctata
caseworm Parapoynx stagnalis
red hairy caterpillars Amsacta albistriga and Amsacta moorei

References

Grasses of India
Millets
Cereals
Plants described in 1919